Smiling Hill Farm is a 500 acre traditional New England farm encompassing parts of the municipalities of Westbrook, Scarborough, and Gorham, Maine. Founded in 1720 as the homestead of Nathaniel Knight, the 12th generation descendants continue to operate the farm today.  Known as the "Knight Farm", the farm was renamed "Smiling Hill Farm" by Roger D. Knight in 1974.  Roger named the farm after a favorite childhood book "Smiling Hill Farm" by  Miriam E. Mason (1937).  Smiling Hill Farm is known for its characteristic smiling cow logo.  Smiling Hill Farm is the 9th oldest continually operating family business in the United States according to Family Business magazine.

History
Smiling Hill Farm was founded in the 1720s as the home of the Knight family. The Knights had been in Scarborough since the mid-1600s starting with George Knight d.1671.  Following George's early death his widow left the family's land holdings in the Dunstan region of Scarborough for the relative safety of Portsmouth, NH, with her two young children Mary and Nathan.  Nathan Knight married Mary Westbrook and returned to Scarborough in the late 1600s with his brother-in-law, Col. Thomas Westbrook.  Col. Thomas Westbrook's gravesite is located on the Scarborough portion of the property.  Col. Westbrook was the uncle of Nathaniel Knight who was the first Knight to occupy the area now known as Smiling Hill Farm.

George Knight  1641-1671
Nathan Knight  1668-1746
Nathaniel Knight  1698-1786
George Knight  1737-1801
George Knight II  1778-1837
Lewis Knight  1827-1909
Benjamin Knight  1855-1939
Perce C. Knight  1887-1972
Roger D. Knight  1935-2015

Today
The farm continues to raise dairy cattle, produce milk, and process milk, ice cream, cheeses and yogurt at the farm's micro-dairy.  The farm bottles milk in reusable glass milk bottles.
Smiling Hill Farm houses Silvery Moon Creamery, an artisanal cheese manufacturer.
Smiling Hill Farm at one time packaged milk for Maine's Own Organic Milk Company.
Smiling Hill Farm also bottles milk in glass bottles for other small local farms in Maine and New Hampshire.
A farm animal exhibit, known as the "Barnyard", has been a popular feature of this farm.
Hillside Lumber, Inc., the Knight family sawmill and building materials supply company is co-located at the farm.

References

External links
 Smiling Hill Farm Website

Dairy products companies of the United States
Companies based in Maine
Farms in Cumberland County, Maine
Buildings and structures in Westbrook, Maine